James or Jim Holloway may refer to:
James L. Holloway Jr. (1898–1984), U.S. Navy admiral, superintendent of the U.S. Naval Academy
James L. Holloway III (1922–2019), U.S. Navy admiral, Chief of Naval Operations, 1974–1978
Jim Holloway (climber) (born 1954), American boulderer
Jim Holloway (artist) (?–2020), artist who worked for TSR in the 1980s
James Holloway (conspirator) (died 1684), English merchant
Jim Holloway (baseball) (1908–1997), Major League Baseball pitcher
James Holloway (historian) (born 1948), British art historian
Red Holloway (James Wesley Holloway, 1927–2012), American jazz saxophonist